is Kokia's fourth album, released in July 2004, eight months after her last album, "Remember Me." The album centres on inspirational songs, including the official song for the Japan team at the 2004 Summer Olympics, "Yume ga Chikara."

The song "Utau Hito" was later used as the ending theme song for the animated film Furusato: Japan in 2007. Director Akio Nishizawa felt the song was so fitting for his film, it was as if the song were commissioned specifically for it. The song featured on Kokia's first greatest hits album, Pearl: The Best Collection, as well as the B-side of her 2007 single "Arigatō... (The Pearl Edition)."

Background

The album was preceded by two singles: "So Much Love for You" in April and "Yume ga Chikara" in June. "So Much Love for You" was used as the sole theme song for the variety show U! Umai n Desu., while one of the B-sides on the single "New Season (Yume ni Mukatte Fuku Kaze)" was used in a commercial for the Japan Vocational School Information Research (全国専門学校広報研究会). However, most of the promotional focus went to "Yume ga Chikara." The song was used as the official cheering song for the Japan team at the 2004 Summer Olympics.

Reception

The album reached #23 on the Japanese Oricon albums charts, selling 20,000 copies. It is Kokia's second most sold album (behind "Remember Me"), as of 2010.

The album received mostly positive reviews from critics. Tomoyuki Mori praised Kokia for her "pure and beautiful vocal quality," and was positive on the inspirational themes on the album. CDJournal gave the album a star of recommendation. They especially praised "Utau Hito," saying that "(Kokia's) fervent singing from the bottom of her heart" made the reviewer fall in love with the song. Also praised were Kokia's motivational songs "Pinch wa Chance" and "New Season (Yume ni Mukatte Fuku Kaze)," along with the acoustic version of "Yume ga Chikara."

Track listing

All songs written and produced by Kokia.

Singles

Japan Sales Rankings

Personnel

 Kiyotsugu Amano - acoustic guitar (#1)
 Katsuhiko Asano - recording/mixing
 Masashi Fujimori - art direction, art work (Chocolate)
 Sayaka Hayakawa - violin (#4)
 Ayako Himata - violin (#2)
 Shigeyuki Hirano - director, tambourine (#6, #8) (Mother Land)
 Junichi "Igao" Igarashi - programming (#8)
 Noriko Inose - photography
 Daisuke Kahara - arranger, programming (#3-5, #7)
 Tetsuto Kato - recording/mixing (Envers)
 Hiroshi Kawasaki - mastering (at Flair)
 Yukie Kazama - management (Mother Land)
 Shoji Kobayashi - score copyist (#1, #10)
 Kokia - arranger (#8), chorus work, song writing, vocals
 Daisuke Kurihara - visuals (Chocolate)
 Akiko Maeda - management (Mother Land)
 Kazuhiro Matsuo - guitars (#3-5, #7-8)
 Fumiaki Miyamoto - oboe (#1, #10)
 Kazuhiko Miyamoto - recording/mixing (#4-5, #7)
 Hajime Mizoguchi - cello (#1, #10)
 Ryōsuke Nakanishi - arranger (#2, #6)
 Akio Namiki - hair, make-up (Kurara System)
 Naruki Niino - management (Mother Land)
 Hiroo Oda - executive producer (Mother Land)

 Yuzo Oka - bass (#5)
 Masayoshi Ookawa - recording/mixing (#1, #10)
 Taisuke Sawachika - arranger, piano, programming (#9)
 Akira Senju - arranger, conductor, keyboards (#1, #10)
 Genpachi Sekiguchi (#6)
 Takeshi Sennoo - piano (#1, #10)
 Nobuhisa Shimizu - executive producer (Victor)
 Setsuko Sugita - strings (gallery music/leader) (#1, #10)
 Yoshimi Sugiura - coordinator (#3-5, #7)
 Yoji Sugiyama - coordinator (Witch Craft) (#1, #10)
 Eiko Suzuki - visual coordinator (V.D.C.)
 Yurika Suzuki - stylist (Dynamic)
 Yoshinari Takegami - saxophone (#5)
 Toshino Tanabe - bass (#6)
 Hiroshi Tanaka - artist promoter (Victor)
 Hiroko Uno - visuals (Chocolate)
 Takefumi Wada - manipulator (#1)
 China Yoshihiko (#2, #6)
 Haruyuki Yukawa - A&R (Victor)

References
 	

Kokia (singer) albums
2004 albums
Victor Entertainment albums
Japanese-language albums